1120 Denny Way is a complex of two high-rise residential buildings that are under construction in South Lake Union, Seattle, Washington, United States. The buildings will both be 41 stories tall, with a total of 1,179 apartments, and connected by a 12-story podium with retail and amenity space. 1120 Denny Way is being developed by Onni Group, which is also redeveloping the adjacent Seattle Times Building site. The project began construction in 2017 and is planned to be completed in 2022.

History

The Seattle Times Company acquired much of its property in the late 1920s, prior to the construction of its headquarters building in 1931. The lot immediately south of the headquarters, facing Denny Way, was converted into a parking lot with a small park at its northeast corner. The company sought to redevelop the lot into a new office building in the 1990s, as part of a cancelled expansion project. The Times Company put the parking lot up for sale in 2011, as part of its plans to sell its headquarters to private developers.

In July 2013, The Times Company announced that it had sold the block, along with the adjoining headquarters, to Onni Group for $62.5 million. The following year, Onni submitted designs for a four-tower project with 1,950 residential units on the two blocks, including a pair of 40-story towers on the Denny block. The proposal included removal of the Seattle Times Park, which sparked outcry from nearby residents and local preservationist Peter Steinbrueck. A revised plan to preserve the park was approved in July 2014, in exchange for raised building heights on the north block. The project was approved in 2016 and began construction in early 2017. It was scheduled to be completed in 2020. , the project is running 15 months behind schedule due to a reconfiguration of the penthouses and the effects of the COVID-19 pandemic.

Design

When completed, 1120 Denny Way will be one of the largest residential projects in the city's history. The complex includes a 41-story,  tower on the northwest corner of the block, facing Boren Avenue and John Street; a 41-story,  tower on the southeast corner, facing Denny Way and Fairview Avenue; and a 12-story podium on the southwest corner, facing Denny Way and Boren Avenue. The northeast corner is the historic Seattle Times Park, which will be expanded to accommodate new public spaces around the project.

The project will have 1,179 residential units, designed to either become apartments or condominiums,  of retail space, and 1,461 underground parking spaces. The podium will include multiple landscaped rooftop decks, as well as two outdoor swimming pools, garden spaces, a solarium, and a children's play area. The podium's exterior will also include historic headlines from The Seattle Times etched into the facade between floors. Early proposals for the complex included the use of a district heating system to save energy.

References

External links
 

Buildings and structures under construction in the United States
Residential skyscrapers in Seattle
South Lake Union, Seattle
The Seattle Times Company
Twin towers